is a passenger railway station in located in the city of Higashiōsaka, Osaka Prefecture, Japan, operated by West Japan Railway Company (JR West).

Lines
JR-Kawachi-Eiwa Station is served by the Osaka Higashi Line, and is located 14.3 kilometers from Shin-Osaka Station.

Station layout
The station has one elevated island platform, capable of accommodating eight-car trains, with the station building underneath. The station is staffed.

Platforms

Adjacent stations

History 
The station was opened on March 15, 2008.

Passenger statistics
In fiscal 2019, the station was used by an average of 8,629 passengers daily (boarding passengers only).

Surrounding area
Kintetsu Kawachi-Eiwa Station
Higashi Osaka Tax Office
Higashi Osaka Pension Office
Higashi Osaka Simple Court
Higashi Osaka Chamber of Commerce

See also
 List of railway stations in Japan

References

External links

Official home page 

Railway stations in Osaka Prefecture
Stations of West Japan Railway Company
Railway stations in Japan opened in 2008
Higashiōsaka